Bolton Green is a village in the Borough of Chorley, Lancashire, England.

Bolton Green Hall farmhouse is a Grade II* listed building dating from 1612.

References

Villages in Lancashire
Geography of Chorley